Events from the year 1996 in Portuguese Macau.

Incumbents
 Governor - Vasco Joaquim Rocha Vieira

Events

October
 23 October - The inauguration of the Museum of Sacred Art and Crypt in Santo António.

References

 
Years of the 20th century in Macau
Macau
Macau
1990s in Macau